Parmesan is an Italian cheese also known as Parmigiano Reggiano.

Parmesan may also refer to:

Parmesan, an adjective meaning related to the city or province of Parma
The Parmigiano dialect
Parmo or Parmesan, a breaded cutlet dish originating in Middlesbrough
Parmigiana or eggplant parmesan, an Italian dish made with fried, sliced eggplant layered with cheese and tomato sauce

See also
 Parmigiano (disambiguation)